The Parker Solar Probe (PSP; previously Solar Probe, Solar Probe Plus or Solar Probe+) is a NASA space probe launched in 2018 with the mission of making observations of the outer corona of the Sun.

the speed of light. It is the fastest object ever built.

The project was announced in the fiscal 2009 budget year. The cost of the project is US$1.5 billion. Johns Hopkins University Applied Physics Laboratory designed and built the spacecraft, which was launched on 12 August 2018. It became the first NASA spacecraft named after a living person, honoring physicist Eugene Newman Parker, professor emeritus at the University of Chicago.

A memory card containing the names of over 1.1 million people was mounted on a plaque and installed below the spacecraft's high-gain antenna on 18 May 2018. The card also contains photos of Parker and a copy of his 1958 scientific paper predicting important aspects of solar physics.

On 29 October 2018, at about 18:04 UTC, the spacecraft became the closest ever artificial object to the Sun. The previous record,  from the Sun's surface, was set by the Helios 2 spacecraft in April 1976. This will be surpassed after each of the two remaining flybys of Venus.

History 
The Parker Solar Probe concept originates in the 1958 report by the Fields and Particles Group (Committee 8 of the National Academy of Sciences' Space Science Board) which proposed several space missions including "a solar probe to pass inside the orbit of Mercury to study the particles and fields in the vicinity of the Sun". Studies in the 1970s and 1980s reaffirmed its importance, but it was always postponed due to cost. A cost-reduced Solar Orbiter mission was studied in the 1990s, and a more capable Solar Probe mission served as one of the centerpieces of the eponymous Outer Planet/Solar Probe (OPSP) program formulated by NASA in the late 1990s. The first three missions of the program were planned to be: the Solar Orbiter, the Pluto and Kuiper belt reconnaissance Pluto Kuiper Express mission, and the Europa Orbiter astrobiology mission focused on Europa.

The original Solar Probe design used a gravity assist from Jupiter to enter a polar orbit which dropped almost directly toward the Sun. While this explored the important solar poles and came even closer to the surface (3 , a perihelion of 4 ), the extreme variation in solar irradiance made for an expensive mission and required a radioisotope thermal generator for power. The trip to Jupiter also made for a long mission ( years to first solar perihelion, 8 years to second).

Following the appointment of Sean O'Keefe as Administrator of NASA, the entirety of the OPSP program was canceled as part of President George W. Bush's request for the 2003 United States federal budget. Administrator O'Keefe cited a need for a restructuring of NASA and its projects, falling in line with the Bush Administration's wish for NASA to refocus on "research and development, and addressing management shortcomings".

In the early 2010s, plans for the Solar Probe mission were incorporated into a lower-cost Solar Probe Plus. The redesigned mission uses multiple Venus gravity assists for a more direct flight path, which can be powered by solar panels. It also has a higher perihelion, reducing the demands on the thermal protection system.

In May 2017, the spacecraft was renamed the Parker Solar Probe in honor of astrophysicist Eugene Newman Parker, who coined the term "solar wind". The solar probe cost NASA US$1.5 billion. The launch rocket bore a dedication in memory of APL engineer Andrew A. Dantzler who had worked on the project.

Spacecraft 
The Parker Solar Probe is the first spacecraft to fly into the low solar corona. It will assess the structure and dynamics of the Sun's coronal plasma and magnetic field, the energy flow that heats the solar corona and impels the solar wind, and the mechanisms that accelerate energetic particles.

The spacecraft's systems are protected from the extreme heat and radiation near the Sun by a solar shield.

A white reflective alumina surface layer minimizes absorption. The spacecraft systems and scientific instruments are located in the central portion of the shield's shadow, where direct radiation from the Sun is fully blocked. If the shield were not between the spacecraft and the Sun, the probe would be damaged and become inoperative within tens of seconds. As radio communication with Earth will take about eight minutes in each direction, the Parker Solar Probe will have to act autonomously and rapidly to protect itself. This will be done using four light sensors to detect the first traces of direct sunlight coming from the shield limits and engaging movements from reaction wheels to reposition the spacecraft within the shadow again. According to project scientist Nicky Fox, the team describe it as "the most autonomous spacecraft that has ever flown".

The primary power for the mission is a dual system of solar panels (photovoltaic arrays). A primary photovoltaic array, used for the portion of the mission outside , is retracted behind the shadow shield during the close approach to the Sun, and a much smaller secondary array powers the spacecraft through closest approach. This secondary array uses pumped-fluid cooling to maintain operating temperature of the solar panels and instrumentation.

Trajectory 

The spacecraft trajectory will include seven Venus flybys over nearly seven years to gradually shrink its elliptical orbit around the Sun, for a total of 24 orbits. The near Sun radiation environment is predicted to cause spacecraft charging effects, radiation damage in materials and electronics, and communication interruptions, so the orbit will be highly elliptical with short times spent near the Sun.

The trajectory requires high launch energy, so the probe was launched on a Delta IV Heavy class launch vehicle and an upper stage based on the Star 48BV solid rocket motor. Interplanetary gravity assists will provide further deceleration relative to its heliocentric orbit, which will result in a heliocentric speed record at perihelion. Like every object in an orbit, due to gravity the spacecraft will accelerate as it nears perihelion, then slow down again afterward until it reaches its aphelion.

Science goals 

The goals of the mission are:
 Trace the flow of energy that heats the solar corona and accelerates the solar wind.
 How is energy from the lower solar atmosphere transferred to, and dissipated in, the corona and solar wind?
 What processes shape the non-equilibrium velocity distributions observed throughout the heliosphere?
 How do the processes in the corona affect the properties of the solar wind in the heliosphere?
 Determine the structure and dynamics of the plasma and magnetic fields at the sources of the solar wind.
 How does the magnetic field in the solar wind source regions connect to the photosphere and the heliosphere?
 Are the sources of the solar wind steady or intermittent?
 How do the observed structures in the corona evolve into the solar wind?
 Explore mechanisms that accelerate and transport energetic particles.
 What are the roles of shocks, reconnection, waves, and turbulence in the acceleration of energetic particles?
 What are the source populations and physical conditions necessary for energetic particle acceleration?
 How are energetic particles transported in the corona and heliosphere?

Instruments 

Parker Solar Probe has four main instruments:

 FIELDS (Electromagnetic Fields Investigation). The instrument suite captures the scale and shape of electric and magnetic fields in the Sun's atmosphere. FIELDS measures waves and turbulence in the inner heliosphere with high time resolution to understand the fields associated with waves, shocks and magnetic reconnection, a process by which magnetic field lines explosively realign. The  antennas are made of a niobium alloy, which can withstand extreme temperatures. FIELDS measures electric fields across a broad frequency range both directly and remotely. Operating in two modes, the four sunlit antennas measure the properties of the fast and slow solar wind — the flow of solar particles constantly streaming out from the Sun. The fifth antenna, which sticks out perpendicular to the others in the shade of the heat shield, helps make a three-dimensional picture of the electric field at higher frequencies. The suite also has three magnetometers to assess the magnetic field. A search coil magnetometer, or SCM, measures how the magnetic field changes over time. Two identical fluxgate magnetometers, MAGi and MAGo, measure the large-scale coronal magnetic field. The fluxgate magnetometers are specialized for measuring the magnetic field further from the Sun where it varies at a slower rate, while the search coil magnetometer is necessary closer to the Sun where the field changes quickly, as it can sample the magnetic field at a rate of two million times per second. The Principal Investigator is Stuart Bale at the University of California, Berkeley.
 IS☉IS (Integrated Science Investigation of the Sun). The instrument uses two complementary instruments to measure particles across a wide range of energies. By measuring electrons, protons and ions, IS☉IS will understand the particles' lifecycles — where they came from, how they became accelerated and how they move out from the Sun through interplanetary space. The two energetic particle instruments on IS☉IS are called EPI-Lo and EPI-Hi (EPI stands for Energetic Particle Instrument). EPI-Lo measures the spectra of electrons and ions and identifies carbon, oxygen, neon, magnesium, silicon, iron and two isotopes of helium, He-3 and He-4. Distinguishing between helium isotopes will help determine which of several theorized mechanisms caused the particles' acceleration. The instrument has a design with an octagonal dome body supporting 80 viewfinders. Multiple viewfinders provide a wide field of view to observe low-energy particles. An ion that enters EPI-Lo through one of the viewfinders first passes through two carbon-polyimide-aluminum foils and then encounters a solid-state detector. Upon impact, the foils produce electrons, which are measured by a microchannel plate. Using the amount of energy left by the ion's impact on the detector and the time it takes the ions to pass through the sensor identifies the species of the particles. EPI-Hi uses three particle sensors composed of stacked layers of detectors to measure particles with energies higher than those measured by EPI-Lo. The front few layers are composed of ultra-thin silicon detectors made up of geometric segments, which allows for the determination of the particle's direction and helps reduce background noise. Charged particles are identified by measuring how deep they travel into the stack of detectors and how many electrons they pull off atoms in each detector, a process called ionization. At closest approach to the Sun, EPI-Hi will be able to detect up to 100,000 particles per second. The Principal Investigator is David McComas at Princeton University.
 WISPR (Wide-field Imager for Solar Probe). These optical telescopes acquire images of the corona and inner heliosphere. WISPR uses two cameras with radiation-hardened Active Pixel Sensor CMOS detectors. The camera's lenses are made of a radiation hard BK7, a common type of glass used for space telescopes, which is also sufficiently hardened against the impacts of dust. The Principal Investigator is Russell Howard at the Naval Research Laboratory.
 SWEAP (Solar Wind Electrons Alphas and Protons). This investigation will count the electrons, protons and helium ions, and measure their properties such as velocity, density, and temperature. Its main instruments are the Solar Probe Analyzers (SPAN, two electrostatic analyzers) and the Solar Probe Cup (SPC). SPC is a Faraday cup, a metal device that can catch charged particles in a vacuum. Peeking over the heat shield to measure how electrons and ions are moving, the cup is exposed to the full light, heat and energy of the Sun. The cup is composed of a series of highly transparent grids — one of which uses variable high voltages to sort the particles — above several collector plates, which measure the particles' properties. The variable voltage grid also helps sort out background noise, such as cosmic rays and photoionized electrons, which could otherwise bias the measurements. The instrument uses pieces of sapphire to electrically isolate different components within the cup. As it passes close to the Sun, SPC takes up to 146 measurements per second to accurately determine the velocity, density and temperature of the Sun's plasma. SPAN is composed of two instruments, SPAN-A and SPAN-B, which have wide fields of view to allow them to see the parts of space not observed by SPC. Particles encountering the detectors enter a maze that sends the particles through a series of deflectors and voltages to sort the particles based on their mass and charge. While SPAN-A has two components to measure both electrons and ions, SPAN-B looks only at electrons. The Principal Investigator is Justin Kasper at the University of Michigan and the Smithsonian Astrophysical Observatory.

Mission 

Parker Solar Probe was launched on 12 August 2018, at 07:31 UTC. The spacecraft operated nominally after launching. During its first week in space it deployed its high-gain antenna, magnetometer boom, and electric field antennas. The spacecraft performed its first scheduled trajectory correction on 20 August 2018, while it was 8.8 million kilometers (5.5 million mi) from Earth, and travelling at 

Instrument activation and testing began in early September 2018. On 9 September 2018, the two WISPR telescopic cameras performed a successful first-light test, transmitting wide-angle images of the background sky towards the galactic center.

Within each orbit of the Parker Solar Probe around the Sun, the portion within 0.25 AU is the Science Phase, in which the probe is actively and autonomously making observations. Communication with the probe is largely cut off in that phase. Science phases run for a few days both before and after each perihelion. They lasted 11.6 days for the earliest perihelion, and will drop to 9.6 days for the final, closest perihelion.

Much of the rest of each orbit is devoted to transmitting data from the science phase. But during this part of each orbit, there are still periods when communication is not possible. First, the requirement that the heat shield of the probe be pointed towards the Sun sometimes puts the heat shield between the antenna and Earth. Second, even when the probe is not particularly near the Sun, when the angle between the probe and the Sun (as seen from Earth) is too small, the Sun's radiation can overwhelm the communication link.

After the first Venus flyby, the probe was in an elliptical orbit with a period of 150 days (two-thirds the period of Venus), making three orbits while Venus makes two. After the second flyby, the period shortened to 130 days. After less than two orbits (only 198 days later) it encountered Venus a third time at a point earlier in the orbit of Venus. This encounter shortened its period to half of that of Venus, or about 112.5 days. After two orbits it met Venus a fourth time at about the same place, shortening its period to about 102 days. After 237 days, it met Venus for the fifth time and its period is shortened to about 96 days, three-sevenths that of Venus. It then makes seven orbits while Venus makes three. The sixth encounter, almost two years after the fifth, will bring its period down to 92 days, two-fifths that of Venus. After five more orbits (two orbits of Venus), it will meet Venus for the seventh and last time, decreasing its period to 88 or 89 days and allowing it to approach closer to the Sun.

Timeline

Findings 

On November 6, 2018, Parker Solar Probe observed first magnetic switchbacks – sudden reversals in the magnetic field of the solar wind. They were first observed by the NASA-ESA  mission Ulysses, the first spacecraft to fly over the Sun's poles.

On 4 December 2019, the first four research papers were published describing findings during the spacecraft's first two dives near the Sun. They reported the direction and strength of the Sun's magnetic field, and described the unusually frequent and short-lived changes in the direction of the Sun's magnetic field. These measurements confirm the hypothesis that Alfvén waves are the leading candidates for understanding the mechanisms that underlie the coronal heating problem. They also reported that, using the "beam of electrons that stream along the magnetic field", they were able to observe that "the reversals in the Sun's magnetic field are often associated with localized enhancements in the radial component of the plasma velocity (the velocity in the direction away from the Sun's centre)". The researchers found a "surprisingly large azimuthal component of the plasma velocity (the velocity perpendicular to the radial direction). This component results from the force with which the Sun's rotation slingshots plasma out of the corona when the plasma is released from the coronal magnetic field".

Parker discovered evidence of a cosmic dust-free zone of 3.5 million miles (5.6 million kilometres) radius from the Sun, due to vaporisation of cosmic dust particles by the Sun's radiation.

On April 28, 2021, during its eighth flyby of the Sun, Parker Solar Probe encountered the specific magnetic and particle conditions at 18.8 solar radii that indicated that it penetrated the Alfvén surface; the probe measured the solar wind plasma environment with its FIELDS and SWEAP instruments. This event was described by NASA as "touching the Sun".

On 25 September 2022, the first discovery of a comet was made in images from the Parker Solar Probe. Several comets had been previously identified in images from the spacecraft however these had all been previously discovered in images from other spacecraft. The new discovery will be named PSP-001. The discovery was made by Peter Berrett, an Australian amateur astronomer and participant in the NASA funded Sungrazer project. PSP-001 was discovered in images from 29 May 2022, part of the spacecraft's 12th approach to the Sun.

The comet belongs to  the Kreutz group.

Gallery

See also 
 
  (ACE), launched 1997
 List of vehicle speed records
 , launched 1995
 , SDO, launched 2010
 , launched 2006
 , launched 1998
 , launched 1994
 
 
 MESSENGER, Mercury orbiter (2011–2015) with sun shield
 
 Solar Orbiter,  Sun-observing space probe developed by the European Space Agency (ESA) launched on 10 February 2020

Notes

References

Further reading

External links 

 Parker Probe Plus at Johns Hopkins University Applied Physics Laboratory (JHUAPL)
 Solar Probe Plus (Mission Engineering Report; JHUAPL)
 Heliophysics Research (NASA)
 Explorers and Heliophysics Projects Division (EHPD; NASA)
 Parker Solar Probe (data and news; NASA)
 Parker Solar Probe (Video/3:45; NYT; August 12, 2018)
 Parker Solar Probe (Video—360°/3:27; NASA; September 6, 2018)
 eoPortal: Mission Status
 PSP/WISPR Encounter Summaries

 
Living With a Star
Missions to the Sun
NASA space probes
Satellites orbiting the Sun
Space probes launched in 2018
Spacecraft launched by Delta IV rockets